XHVDR-FM is a noncommercial radio station on 100.3 FM in Cacahoatán, Chiapas. The station is owned by Juana Patricia Ruiz Sánchez and carries a Christian music format known as Visión del Rey.

History
XHVDR was permitted in March 2012 and authorized for a power increase in 2016.

References

Radio stations in Chiapas
Radio stations established in 2012
Christian radio stations in Mexico